Jean-Luc Seigle (1956 – 5 March 2020) was a French contemporary dramatist, screenwriter and writer.

Biography 
Fabienne Pascaud, in the magazine Télérama writes:  and that he

Novels 
2001: La Nuit dépeuplée, Paris, Flammarion, 
2004: Le Sacre de l'enfant mort, Flammarion, :
2006: Laura ou l'Énigme des vingt-deux lames, Paris, M. Lafon, 
2012: En vieillissant les hommes pleurent, Flammarion,  
Grand prix RTL-Lire 2012. - Prix Octave Mirbeau 2013.
2015: Je vous écris dans le noir; Flammarion,   – devoted to Pauline Dubuisson; Grand prix des lectrices de Elle

Scripts 
 for cinema
 1994:  by 
 1998: The Carriers Are Waiting by Benoît Mariage

 for television (partial list)
 Week-end
 Le Serment de Mado
 1995: La Veuve de l'architecte by 
 1996:  by Jean Sagols
 1997: Un homme digne de confiance by Philippe Monnier
 1997:  by Marion Sarraut
 1999:  by 
 2000: Joséphine, ange gardien by Nicolas Cuche (1 Episode)
 2006:  by 
 2007:  by 

As well as twenty others in collaboration.

Theatre 
 1981: Le Songe, Festival du Marais 
 1983: L'Absent,  Théâtre Marie Stuart  
 1990: Marie Ignota, Théâtre Ouvert 
 2008: La Gouvernante de Sigmaringen
 2009: La Dernière Nuit de Mona Parker
 2011: Médée et le Truc en plume
 2012: Excusez-moi pour la poussière

References

External links 
 Jean-Luc Seigle on Babelio
 Jean-Luc Seigle donne sa version de "La Vérité" (interview) on RTL
 Je vous écris dans le noir, Jean-Luc Seigle on La Cause Littéraire
 Official website
 

21st-century French non-fiction writers
20th-century French dramatists and playwrights
21st-century French dramatists and playwrights
French screenwriters
People from Puy-de-Dôme
2020 deaths
1956 births
Date of birth missing